The Central News Agency (CNA) is a government-controlled news agency in Taiwan.

In addition to its Chinese language edition, it also has English and Japanese editions. It has a 300-strong employee base, and overseas branches in some 30 countries. It works with a number of well-known news agencies around the world, such as the Associated Press, Reuters, Deutsche Welle, and Agence France-Presse.

History
The agency was founded , by the Kuomintang.  Its headquarters was originally located in Guangzhou in Guangdong, but had to be relocated to Taipei in 1949, following the defeat of the Republic of China government in mainland China in the Chinese Civil War.

Despite the corporatisation of the agency in 1973, it continued to receive heavy government subsidies, and remained the nation's official agency. At the time, CNA journalists received preferential treatment on various occasions, mostly government-related press conferences.

After democratization, on 1 July 1996, the agency became a non-profit organisation under a bill passed by the Legislative Yuan.  As of 2022, it is still Taiwan's official news agency, and received part of its funding from the Executive Yuan. However, its media influence is said to have diminished due to a rise in competition after the government decided to lift restrictions on mass media.

A Spanish language edition, Enfoque en Taiwán, was closed 31 March 2021. In August 2021, CNA oversaw the launch of the TaiwanPlus streaming platform.

See also
Mass media in Taiwan

References

External links

CNA.com.tw — Central News Agency official website (Taiwanese)
FocusTaiwan — Central News Agency - English news
フォーカス台湾 — Central News Agency - Japanese news

1924 establishments in China
1949 establishments in Taiwan
News agencies based in Taiwan
Companies based in Taipei
Government-owned companies of Taiwan
Mass media companies established in 1924
Multilingual news services
State media